Timothy Paul Young (born April 9, 1969 in Moorestown, New Jersey) is an American rower.

References 

 

1969 births
Living people
American male rowers
Rowers at the 1996 Summer Olympics
Olympic silver medalists for the United States in rowing
People from Moorestown, New Jersey
Medalists at the 1996 Summer Olympics
Pan American Games medalists in rowing
Pan American Games silver medalists for the United States
Rowers at the 1995 Pan American Games
Medalists at the 1995 Pan American Games
Connecticut College alumni